Daniel Sullivan is a former American football coach.  He served as the head football coach at Eureka College in Eureka, Illinois from 2005 to 2008, compiling a record of 5–30.  Sullivan resigned as head football coach at Eureka in October 2008.  A graduate of University High School in Normal, Illinois, Sullivan played college football at Loras College in Dubuque, Iowa.  He earned a master's degree in sports administration from Illinois State University in 2001.  Sullivan spent two seasons as co-defensive coordinator at the University of Chicago before he was hired at Eureka.

Head coaching record

References

Year of birth missing (living people)
Living people
Chicago Maroons football coaches
Eureka Red Devils football coaches
Loras Duhawks football players
Illinois State University alumni
People from Normal, Illinois
Players of American football from Illinois